The College of Biomedical Sciences of the National Polytechnic Institute is an institute of higher education in Mexico.  The College was proposed in 1932 by Secretary of Public Education  Narciso Bassols. Currently the College is divided in two Superior Schools and two National Schools:

National School of Biological Sciences
ENCB "Escuela Nacional de Ciencias Biológicas"

National School of Medicine and Homeopathy
ENMyH "Escuela Nacional de Medicina y Homeopatía"

Superior School of Medicine
ESM "Escuela Superior de Medicina"

Superior School of Nursing
ESEyO "Escuela Superior de Enfermería y Obstetricia"

References

Instituto Politécnico Nacional